Biostatistics Center may refer to:
George Washington University Biostatistics Center
Center for Biostatistics at the Ohio State University
Biostatistics Center at Massachusetts General Hospital
Johns Hopkins Biostatistics Center at the Johns Hopkins Bloomberg School of Public Health